This is a list of town tramway systems in Chile by region.  It includes all tram systems, past and present. Regions of Chile are arranged geographically, from north to south.

XV Arica-Parinacota

Note for Arica: Morrison (1992)  states that old postcards show rails in the streets of this town, but no other evidence of a town tramway could be found.

I Tarapacá

II Antofagasta

III Atacama

IV Coquimbo

V Valparaíso

RM Región Metropolitana de Santiago

Neighboring and suburban tramway systems in the Santiago region, arranged anti- (counter-) clockwise, northwest to east.

VI O'Higgins

VII Maule

Curicó Morrison  states that Chilean government statistics reported an animal-powered tramway in Curicó Province, but that histories of Curicó town state that no tramway was built.

VIII Bío-Bío

Non-public tramway:

Note for Concepción, Concepción – Talcahuano and Talcahuano: Operation suspended Jan 24, 1939 – Feb 1939 because of damage caused by earthquake.

IX Araucanía

 Collipulli: Morrison  states that the tramway listed here in Chilean government statistics was in fact a goods (freight) railway, worked by electric traction.

X Los Lagos

XII Magallanes y Antártica Chilena

References
Books, Periodicals and External Links

See also
List of town tramway systems
List of town tramway systems in South America
List of light-rail transit systems
List of rapid transit systems
List of trolleybus systems

Tramways
Chile